Louis  Horst (born January 12, 1884, Kansas City, Missouri – died January 23, 1964, New York City) was a composer, and pianist. He helped to define the principles of modern dance choreographic technique, most notably the matching of choreography to pre-existing musical structure and the use of contemporary music for dance scores.

Biography and work
Horst was the musical director for the Denishawn company (1916-25) before working as musical director and dance composition teacher for Martha Graham's school and dance company (1926-48).

One memorable piece of advice that Horst gave dancers in his lessons in the 1930s, at times delivered in a sarcastic tone: "when in doubt, turn." This is a variant of Ted Shawn's famous line "When in doubt, twirl." The Grateful Dead Almanac adopted it as their motto.

Apart from being a personal friend and mentor to Graham, Horst worked and wrote scores for many other choreographers, including:
 Ruth St. Denis
 Ted Shawn
 Helen Tamiris
 Martha Hill
 Doris Humphrey and Charles Weidman
 Agnes de Mille
 Ruth Page
 Michio Ito
 Adolph Bolm
 Harald Kreutzberg
 Pearl Lang
 Jean Erdman
 Anna Sokolow, Horst's assistant and demonstrator

Career 

Horst composed scores for the Denishawn company, including Japanese Spear Dance (1919). He composed several of Graham's early group works: Primitive Mysteries (1931), Celebration (1934), Frontier (1935),  and El Penitente (1940). For Anna Sokolow, Horst composed Noah (1935). He also composed several movie scores.

Horst taught art of choreography at Neighborhood Playhouse School of the Theater (1928-1964), Bennington College (1934-45), Mills College, Connecticut College (1948–63), Barnard College, Sarah Lawrence College, Columbia University,  and The Juilliard School (1951-64).

Horst lectured often on "Dance Composition", "Music Composition for Dance", and "Modern Dance and Its Relation to the Other Modern Arts". He wrote and published two books: Pre-classic Dance Forms (1937) and Modern Dance Forms (1960). He founded and edited Dance Observer Journal (1933-64).

In 1964 he became the second recipient of the Heritage Award of the National Dance Association.

References

External links
 Louis Horst collection (of scores) in the Music Division of The New York Public Library for the Performing Arts.

1884 births
1964 deaths
Modern dance
Martha Graham